The fifth full elections for Guildford Borough Council took place on 1 May 1987.  The Conservatives retained control of the council winning 30 of the 45 seats on the council.  This represented one net loss for the Conservatives, relative to the 1983 council elections.  Labour retained its 6 councillors.  The SDP-Liberal Alliance won 9 seats, a net gain of two seats on the 1983 council elections.  No independents were elected to the council, one had been elected in 1983.

Three wards partly or wholly changed hands in the 1987 council elections relative to the 1983 council elections.  The SDP-Liberal Alliance gained one councillor from the Conservatives in Stoughton and gained a further councillor from the Conservatives in Normandy.

The Conservatives gained one councillor in Tillingbourne from an independent.

In 1982, the Local Government Boundary Commission recommended the transfer of the southern part of Send parish to West Clandon parish.  This measure was implemented by Statutory Instrument 1984 No 411 known as the Guildford Parishes Order, which adjusted the ward boundaries at the same time.  That Order also produced a number of minor changes to other Guildford parish boundaries the most significant of which, other than the Send-Clandon boundary change, was the transfer of the easterly part of Shalford parish to St Martha's parish in Tillingbourne ward.

Results

References

1987
1987 English local elections
1980s in Surrey